Michael Jeffries is a rhythm and blues singer from Memphis, Tennessee, best known for his stint as a lead vocalist for the R&B/Soul band Tower of Power from 1978 to the Mid-1980s.

History
Jeffries got his start as a part of the California band, The Two Things In One and scored a regional hit with the 1973 single "Together Forever".  It would lead to his stint with Tower of Power starting with 1978's We Came to Play! and he would stay with the band through the Mid-1980s, making his stint with TOP the second longest stint as lead vocalist, behind Larry Braggs.

Jeffries would go solo with the single "Razzle Dazzle" from the soundtrack to the movie Wildcats.  He would also record with Jeff Lorber and fellow R&B singer Karyn White before releasing his first self-titled solo album for Warner Bros. Records; ironically enough, the same label his old band Tower of Power once called home.  The album was produced by Janet Jackson's producers and former members of The Time Jimmy Jam and Terry Lewis.  He still lives in California and has released a new album with his kids as "Michael Jeffries, Daughter, Son" called Family Affair in 2010.  Also in 2011, a compilation of his recordings with The Two Things In One was released called Together Forever: The Music City Sessions.  On March 26, 2019, Jeffries released his next solo album Fonky Sexy Late Nights in the Lab and released a music video for "When We Love" off the album on his YouTube channel.

Discography

With The Two Things In One
"Silly Song"/"Snag Nasty" (Music City Records) (1971)
"Together Forever"/"Stop Telling Me" (Music City Records) (1973)
"Overdose"/"Close The Door" (Music City Records) (1974)
Together Forever: The Music City Sessions (Omnivore Recordings) (2011)

With Skye
"Ain't No Need" (single) (Anada Records/A&M Records) (1976)

with Tower of Power
We Came to Play! (Columbia Records) (1978)
Back on the Streets (Columbia Records) (1979)
Direct (Sheffield Lab) (1981)
Dinosaur Tracks (Rhino Handmade) (2000)

with Jeff Lorber
Private Passion (Warner Bros. Records) (1986)

Solo albums
"Razzle Dazzle" (single) (Warner Bros. Records) (1986)
Michael Jeffries (Warner Bros. Records) (1989)
"And I Love Her (Beatles cover)" (single-released in Germany) (Bellaphon Records) (1992)
Family Affair (MJM Artists Records) (2010)
Fonky Sexy Late Nights In The Lab (MJM Artists Records) (March 26, 2019)

References

External links
 Michael Jeffries official website
 Michael Jeffries official YouTube channel
 Michael Jeffries 2011 Interview at Soulinterviews.com

American rhythm and blues singers
Musicians from Memphis, Tennessee
Living people
Year of birth missing (living people)
Tower of Power members